Tennis is a sport that has been included in the program of the Island Games, which is a multi-sport event held every two years between teams representing islands that are members of the International Island Games Association. The event includes both men's and women's singles and doubles competitions, and the format is similar to that of other international tennis tournaments. The first Island Games were held in 1985 and included tennis as one of the sports. Since then, the sport has been included in every edition of the games.

 Member Islands could bring a maximum of 5 men and 5 women players to the Games.
 Singles - a maximum of 4 Men and 4 Women competitors per Member Island
 Doubles - a maximum of 2 Men and 2 Women pairs per Member Island
 Mixed Doubles - a maximum of 4 pairs per Member Island
 Team - A maximum of 1 Men's Team and 1 Ladies Team each to consist of a maximum of 4 players and a minimum of 2 players.
 Minimum age - 14

Events

Top Medalists

Men's

Men's singles

Men's doubles

Men's Team

Women's

Women's singles

Women's doubles

Women's Team

Mixed doubles

References

 
Sports at the Island Games
Island Games